An asset management company (AMC) is an asset management / investment management company/firm that invests the pooled funds of retail investors in securities in line with the stated investment objectives. For a fee, the company/firm provides more diversification, liquidity, and professional management consulting service than is normally available to individual investors. The diversification of portfolio is done by investing in such securities which are inversely correlated to each other. Money is collected from investors by way of floating various collective investment schemes, e.g. mutual fund schemes. In general, an AMC is a company that is engaged primarily in the business of investing in, and managing, portfolios of securities. A study by consulting firm Casey Quirk, which is owned by Deloitte, found that asset management firms ended 2020 with record highs in both revenue and assets under management.

Largest companies
The following is a list of the top 20 asset managers in the world (as of 2022), ranked by total assets under management (AUM):

Asset management firms worldwide

Africa and Middle East

 Allan Gray 
 Clarity Capital
 Coronation Fund Managers
 EFG Hermes
 eToro
 First City Monument Bank
 Heirs Holdings
 Investcorp
 Kingdom Holding Company
 NBK Capital
 Ninety One ltd
 Old Mutual
 Public Investment Corporation
 Sanlam
 STANLIB
 UAP Old Mutual Holdings

Americas

 AdvisorShares
 Affiliated Managers Group
 AllianceBernstein
 Allspring Global Investments
 American Century Investments
 Ameriprise Financial
 AQR Capital
 Barings LLC
 BlackRock
 Blackstone
 BNY Mellon Investment Management
 Bridgewater Associates
 Brookfield Asset Management
 BTG Pactual
 Calamos Investments
 Cambridge Associates
 Cambridge Investment Research
 Capital Group Companies
 Charles Schwab Corporation
 CI Financial
 Cohen & Steers
 Columbia Threadneedle Investments
 Conning
 Dimensional Fund Advisors
 Dodge & Cox
 Dreyfus Corporation
 Eaton Vance
 Edward Jones Investments
 Federated Hermes
 Fidelity Investments
 Fisher Investments
 Franklin Templeton Investments
 GAMCO Investors
 GBC Asset Management
 Geode Capital Management
 Gluskin Sheff
 Guardian Capital Group
 Harbert Management Corporation
 Harris Associates
 Hartford
 Invesco
 Itaú Unibanco
 J. & W. Seligman & Co.
 Janus Capital Group
 Knight Vinke Asset Management
 Legg Mason
 Loomis, Sayles & Company
 Lord Abbett
 LSV Asset Management
 Mackenzie Investments
 Manulife Investment Management
 Merrill
 MFS Investment Management
 Natixis Investment Managers
 Neuberger Berman
 NISA Investment Advisors
 Northern Trust
 Nuveen Investments
 Oaktree Capital Management
 Payden & Rygel
 PGIM
 PIMCO
 PineBridge Investments
 Power Financial
 Principal Financial Group
 Putnam Investments
 Pzena Investment Management
 RLJ Companies
 Ruane, Cunniff & Goldfarb
 Russell Investments
 SEI Investments Company
 Sprucegrove Investment Management
 State Street Global Advisors
 Sun Life Financial
 T. Rowe Price
 TCW Group
 TIAA
 Tsai Capital
 The Vanguard Group
 Virtus Investment Partners
 Waddell & Reed
 Walden Asset Management
 Wellington Management Company
 Wilshire Associates
 WisdomTree Investments
 XP Inc.

Asia-Pacific

 Affin Hwang Capital
 AMP Capital
 Asia Frontier Capital
 Asset Management One
 Australian Ethical Investment
 Axis Mutual Fund
 BetaShares
 Bosera Asset Management
 Aditya Birla Sun Life Asset Management
 BT
 Capital Dynamics
 China Asset Management
 China Southern Asset Management
 Colonial First State
 E Fund Management
 Eastspring Investments
 First Sentier Investors
 Harvest Fund Management
 ICICI Prudential Mutual Fund
 IDFC Project Equity
 IFM Investors
 Investors Mutual Limited
 Kotak Mutual Fund
 L&T Mutual Fund
 Macquarie Asset Management
 Magellan Financial Group
 Mirae Asset Financial Group
 Mitsubishi UFJ Trust and Banking Corporation
 Perpetual Limited
 Platinum Asset Management
 Plenary Group
 Samsung Asset Management
 SBI Mutual Fund
 Shinhan Asset Management
 SPARX Group
 Sumitomo Mitsui Trust Holdings
 Tianhong Asset Management
 UTI Asset Management
 Value Partners

Europe

 Abrdn
 Aegon N.V.
 Alliance Trust
 Allianz Global Investors
 Amundi
 APG
 Ashmore Group
 Aviva Investors
 AXA Investment Managers
 Azimut Holding
 Baillie Gifford
 Bluebay Asset Management
 BNP Paribas Asset Management
 Brewin Dolphin
 Candriam Investors Group
 The Children's Mutual
 Climate Change Capital
 DekaBank
 DWS Group
 Edinburgh Partners
 Eurizon Capital
 F&C Asset Management
 Fidelity International
 Genevalor Benbassat & Cie
 Generali Investments
 Generation Investment Management
 Henderson Group
 Henderson New Star
 HSBC
 Insight Investment
 Invesco Perpetual
 Intelligent Money
 Janus Henderson
 Jupiter Fund Management
 Van Lanschot Kempen
 La Française Group
 Legal & General
 LGT Group
 Liongate Capital Management
 M&G Investments
 Mercury Asset Management
 Mirabaud Group
 Natixis Investment Managers
 Newton Investment Management
 NN Investment Partners
 Old Mutual
 Rathbones
 Lombard Odier
 Robeco
 Royal London Asset Management
 Schroders
 Scottish Mortgage Investment Trust
 Scottish Widows
 Skagen Funds
 Stodir
 Superfund Group
 Tilney Ltd.
 UBS
 Union Investment

References

See also
 List of investment banks
 List of private-equity firms
 List of venture capital firms

Finance lists
Asset

Asset management
Knowledge firms